Donald Robert Davis (June 23, 1931 – April 10, 2008) was an American politician. He served in many roles, from decorated war veteran to petroleum executive, board chairman, association president, Jacksonville City Council president and Florida state legislator.

Early life and military service
Don Davis was born in Okemah, Oklahoma to Lucien and Lucille Davis. He grew up in Coronado, California and graduated from Coronado High School in 1949. He attended the University of Redlands in California before serving in the United States Army for three years, leaving the service as a sergeant first class. He was a decorated Korean War veteran, earning the Combat Infantryman Badge, the National Defense Service Medal and the Korean Service Medal with 3 service stars. After returning to the states, Mr. Davis married Alice Claudia Berry of Miami on December 18, 1954. He resumed his education and received a degree from the University of California, Los Angeles (UCLA) in 1959.

From West Coast to East Coast
The family moved to Jacksonville, Florida in 1960 with the Occidental Life Insurance Company (now Transamerica Corporation), where they raised their two sons, Robert (Don, Jr.) and Dean. During several years in the insurance industry as a Chartered Life Underwriter (CLU), Davis established a reputation of integrity and was asked to serve on the Local Government Study Commission (LGSC) which the Florida legislature created in 1965. Their mission was to design a consolidated city/county government; their goal was to reform Jacksonville's corrupt, inefficient government. During this period, Davis changed careers, and was named General Manager of Deerwood Country Club, a position he held for over 20 years. In 1978, he was named vice president of Stockton, Whatley, Davin & Co. (SWD), responsible for all Deerwood Club operations, including the sale of residences and home sites.

Gate
When Gate Petroleum bought the Florida real estate holdings of SWD in 1985, Herb Peyton offered Don Davis the position of Vice President of Corporate Relations, which he accepted. He was a Gate brother for over twenty years.

Politics
Don Davis was elected to the Jacksonville City Council in 1987 and re-elected twice, serving 12 years, including two terms as president. Davis then ran for the Florida House of Representatives from District 18 in 1999 and served until his death in 2008.

Community activities
Mr. Davis was an active member in many community organizations for 45 years and served on a number of boards. Among his many interests were the following: 
American Cancer Society, past Board of Directors
Florida Theatre, Board of Directors
 Jacksonville 1st Tee, Board of Directors
 Honorable Company of Red Coats, Chairman-1999-2000
 Prisoners of Christ, Board of Directors
The Players Championship, Chairman 1988
Gator Bowl Association, President 1987
American Heart Association
 Mandarin Rotary Club, President-1985
Jacksonville University Council
 Jacksonville Jaycees, past President
 Jacksonville Chamber of Commerce
 Florida Chamber of Commerce
 Deerwood Country Club
Big Brothers of Jacksonville, Board of Directors
Boy's Clubs of Jacksonville, Board of Directors
 Northeast Florida Tennis Foundation
United Way of Northeast Florida, Board of Directors
 Mazda Senior TPC golf tournament, Chairman-1988
 Muscular Dystrophy Association, Board of Directors

Death
In 2007, Representative Don Davis was diagnosed with brain cancer. He died at his home in Jacksonville, Florida on April 10, 2008, at age 76 . In his honor, Florida Governor Charlie Crist ordered that flags at state facilities be flown at half-staff.

The governor issued a statement: "It is with great sadness that we mark the passing of Representative Don Davis, a great public servant. He served the people of Jacksonville as well as the people of our state with honor and dignity. He will be remembered for his efforts to raise the quality of life for our people by growing and attracting businesses to Florida.

His legislative seat remained unfilled until Ronald Renuart was elected at the next regular election in November 2008.

References

External links
 Florida House of Representatives website: Rep. Don Davis
 Jacksonville Business Journal: Apr 10, 2008-Don Davis dies at 76
 Vote Don Davis website
 First Coast News: Apr 10, 2008-State Representative Don Davis Dies
 Obituary, Donald Robert Davis

1931 births
2008 deaths
People from Okemah, Oklahoma
Republican Party members of the Florida House of Representatives
United States Army personnel of the Korean War
Jacksonville, Florida City Council members
Deaths from brain cancer in the United States
University of Redlands alumni
University of California, Los Angeles alumni
20th-century American politicians
Baptists from Oklahoma
United States Army soldiers
20th-century Baptists
Gate Petroleum